Louis-Phillip Edmonston (26 May 1944 – 2 December 2022) was a Canadian consumer advocate, writer, journalist, and politician. Along with Andrew Scheer, he was one of the few politicians with dual American and Canadian citizenship to be elected to the Parliament of Canada.

Edmonston was best known for his series of annual Lemon-Aid car guides. He lived in Panama at the end of his life.

Background
Born in Washington, D.C., Edmonston served as a United States Army infantry medic in Panama from 1961 to 1964, where he witnessed the so-called flag riots, and graduated from the Canal Zone College. He subsequently immigrated to Montreal, where he became known as a journalist and consumer advocate.

In journalism, Edmonston has worked as a television reporter, a syndicated newspaper columnist, and a host of his own open-line show.

Consumer advocate
In 1968 he founded the Automobile Protection Association (APA), which uncovered and disseminated information about automobile defects and successfully pressured the auto industry for several recalls. Edmonston was president of the APA until 1987. In that role, he worked on thousands of consumer claims against automobile manufacturers and won million-dollar settlements and hundreds of lawsuits for consumers.

His work with the association led to the Lemon-Aid series of car manuals, issued annually since the 1970s.

Edmonston has served as a pro bono witness on automobile defects and safety before numerous courts and government committees. In 1982, he testified on inadequate automobile quality and rust protection before the United States Senate Subcommittee on Technology and successfully pressured Ford to become the first automaker to provide a corrosion compensation warranty.

Edmonston was the author of over 100 best-selling books on consumer rights and the automobile industry.

Political career
Edmonston entered Canadian politics in the 1988 federal election as a candidate for the New Democratic Party (NDP) in Chambly, Quebec, placing second. He won the riding in his second attempt, a 1990 by-election in which he defeated former Quebec cabinet minister Clifford Lincoln by almost 20,000 votes, becoming the first member of parliament from Quebec to be elected for the NDP. (Another Quebec MP, Robert Toupin from Terrebonne, had previously crossed the floor to the NDP in 1986.)

His relationship with the NDP was at times turbulent. During the party's 1989 leadership campaign, he threatened to resign from the party if Dave Barrett became leader. A Quebec nationalist, Edmonston was offended by Barrett's view that western alienation was more important than Quebec's grievances over the constitution. Edmonston's differences with the NDP over its position on Canadian federalism and against decentralization and devolving powers to Quebec contributed to his decision not to run for re-election in 1993.

Archives
There is a Phil Edmonston fonds at Library and Archives Canada. Archival reference number is R3727.

Death
Edmonston died in Panama on 2 December 2022, at the age of 78.

Sources

External links
LemonAidCars.com
Audio interview with THECOMMENTARY.CA November 2007
 

1944 births
2022 deaths
Activists from Montreal
Consumer rights activists
Canadian activists
Journalists from Montreal
New Democratic Party MPs
Members of the House of Commons of Canada from Quebec
Naturalized citizens of Canada
American emigrants to Canada
Military personnel from Washington, D.C.
Politicians from Washington, D.C.
Anglophone Quebec people
United States Army soldiers
Writers from Montreal
Writers from Washington, D.C.
Canadian male non-fiction writers
20th-century Canadian non-fiction writers
21st-century Canadian non-fiction writers
20th-century Canadian male writers
21st-century Canadian male writers
Expatriates in Panama